Antonio del Río (c. 1745 – c. 1789) was a captain who led the first excavation of the Mayan ruins of Palenque in Chiapas, Mexico.  The expedition was undertaken in 1787 for Charles III of Spain, following reports of the ruins from native inhabitants.  It took the team two weeks to dig, and it then spent three weeks studying the site.  He was accompanied by Ricardo Almendáriz who created drawings of the ruins still considered scientifically useful.

References

 
 
  
  
 Eighteenth-Century Drawings of Palenque at Library of Congress

External links
 

1745 births
1789 deaths
18th-century Mesoamericanists
Spanish Mesoamericanists
Mayanists
People of New Spain